

178001–178100 

|-id=008
| 178008 Picard ||  || Claude Picard (1942–2008), a French engineer and astronomer, creator of the Commission Cosmologie of the Societé Astronomique de France || 
|-id=014
| 178014 Meslay || 2006 RG || Christiane Meslay (1957–2019) was a French computer engineer, who introduced the first local ethernet network at the Dax Observatory  in 1996. This allowed for the discovery of comet C/1997 J2 (Meunier–Dupouy) via remote control of the telescope and CCD. || 
|}

178101–178200 

|-id=113
| 178113 Benjamindilday ||  || Benjamin Dilday (born 1975), an American Astronomer with the Sloan Digital Sky Survey || 
|-id=150
| 178150 Taiyuinkwei ||  || Tai Yuin-Kwei (1897–1982), a Taiwanese physicist and educator who set up the National Taiwan University Department of Physics and the Graduate Inst of Geophysics, National Central University || 
|-id=151
| 178151 Kulangsu ||  || The Chinese island of Kulangsu (Gulangyu), located off the southwestern coast of the city of Xiamen || 
|-id=155
| 178155 Kenzaarraki ||  || Kenza Arraki (born 1988), an American astronomer who discovered asteroids as an undergraduate using data from the Sloan Digital Sky Survey || 
|-id=156
| 178156 Borbála ||  || Borbála Ujhelyi (born 1982), wife of the Hungarian astronomer Zoltán Kuli who co-discovered this minor planet || 
|}

178201–178300 

|-id=226
| 178226 Rebeccalouise ||  || Rebecca Louise Puckett (born 1976), née Ramsay, wife of discovery team member Andrew W. Puckett, because it was discovered three days before their first wedding anniversary || 
|-id=243
| 178243 Schaerding ||  || Schärding, Upper Austria, home town of the discoverer Richard Gierlinger || 
|-id=256
| 178256 Juanmi ||  || Juan Miguel Lacruz Camblor (born 1988), son of Spanish astronomer Juan Lacruz who discovered this minor planet || 
|-id=263
| 178263 Wienphilo ||  || The Vienna Philharmonic, a world-renowned orchestra based in Vienna, Austria || 
|-id=267
| 178267 Sarajevo ||  || Sarajevo, the capital and largest city of Bosnia and Herzegovina. || 
|-id=294
| 178294 Wertheimer ||  || Egon Ranshofen-Wertheimer (1894–1957), an Austrian diplomat, journalist and historian, involved in the establishment of the United Nations || 
|}

178301–178400 

|-bgcolor=#f2f2f2
| colspan=4 align=center | 
|}

178401–178500 

|-bgcolor=#f2f2f2
| colspan=4 align=center | 
|}

178501–178600 

|-id=534
| 178534 Mosheelitzur ||  || Moshe Elitzur (born 1944), an American physicist and emeritus professor at the University of Kentucky, who has significantly contributed to the theories of maser and dust radiation transfer in astrophysical environments. || 
|}

178601–178700 

|-id=603
| 178603 Pinkine ||  || Nickalaus Pinkine (born 1967), a manager at the Johns Hopkins University Applied Physics Laboratory, who worked as a Deputy Mission Operations Manager on the New Horizons mission to Pluto || 
|-id=679
| 178679 Piquette ||  || Marcus R. Piquette (born 1990), a graduate student researcher at the University of Colorado, who worked on the Student Dust Counter instrument for the New Horizons mission to Pluto || 
|}

178701–178800 

|-id=796
| 178796 Posztoczky ||  || Károly Posztoczky (1882–1963), Hungarian landowner and amateur astronomer || 
|}

178801–178900 

|-id=803
| 178803 Kristenjohnson ||  || Kristen Johnson (born 1985), American officer of the Foundation for Blind Children in Phoenix, Arizona, and of the National Federation of the Blind, and daughter of astronomer Wayne Johnson || 
|-id=830
| 178830 Anne-Véronique || 2001 HT || Anne-Véronique Hernandez (born 1969) is the wife of astronomer Michel Hernandez, one of this minor planet's discoverers at Observatory of Saint-Veran, France || 
|}

178901–179000 

|-id=987
| 178987 Jillianredfern ||  || Jillian A. Redfern (born 1979), a Manager for Research and Development at the Southwest Research Institute, who worked with the Alice UV Spectrometer Instrument on the New Horizons mission to Pluto || 
|}

References 

178001-179000